The Deep End is the fourth album by Norwegian rock band Madrugada. Recorded at Sound City studios in Los Angeles and produced by George Drakoulias, It was released on EMI Records in February 2005. Featuring some of their most accessible songs to date, the album cemented the bands' place as one of Norway's most successful of all time.

This album has been released with the Copy Control protection system in some regions.

Track listing
All tracks written by Høyem and Madrugada, except 10 & 12 by Burås, Høyem and Madrugada.
 "The Kids Are on High Street" – 4:57
 "On Your Side" – 3:53
 "Hold on to You" – 6:34
 "Stories from the Streets" – 5:19
 "Running Out of Time" – 6:08
 "The Lost Gospel" – 3:53
 "Elektro Vakuum" – 4:50
 "Subterranean Sunlight" – 3:59
 "Hard to Come Back" – 4:04
 "Ramona" – 3:55
 "Slow Builder" – 6:14
 "Sail Away" – 6:09
 "Life in the City (Bonus Track)" - 2:58
 "I'm in Love (Bonus Track)" - 4:27

References 
 

2005 albums
Madrugada (band) albums
Albums produced by George Drakoulias
Albums recorded at Sound City Studios
EMI Records albums